All In is the fifth studio album from San Francisco, California-based alternative rock band Stroke 9. It was released on November 9, 2004.

Track listing
 "How Am I Gonna Know"
 "Runaway"
 "Set You Free"
 "Stop Saying Goodbye"
 "Faux Gucci Girl"
 "Rod Beck"
 "Words to Live By"
 "Abandon Confusion"
 "My Advice"
 "Parte"

References

Stroke 9 albums
2004 albums